"Bring It On...Bring It On" is a song written and performed by James Brown. The recording was released as a single in 1983 on the independent Churchill/Augusta record label. The song failed to chart in the United States, but reached #45 on the UK Singles Chart. (The album's B-side, the R&B standard "The Night Time Is the Right Time (To Be With the One That You Love)", did chart #73 R&B in the US) "Bring It On" also appeared on the album Bring It On!.

References

James Brown songs
Songs written by James Brown
1983 singles
1983 songs